The Wapsipinicon River (locally known as the Wapsi) is a tributary of the Mississippi River, approximately  long, starting near the southeastern border of Minnesota and running through northeastern Iowa in the United States. It drains a rural farming region of rolling hills and bluffs north of Waterloo and Cedar Rapids.

Course
It rises in Mower County, Minnesota and enters Iowa in northern Mitchell County. It flows generally southeast across rural Chickasaw, Bremer, and Buchanan counties, past Independence and Anamosa. Along its lower  it turns east, forming the boundary between Clinton and Scott counties.

It defines the western boundary of the Driftless Area. While the Wapsi has a soft, recent catchment, the Driftless, to the east and north, tumbles down to the Mississippi in rugged canyons.

Name
The name of the river in the Ojibwe language is Waabizipinikaan-ziibi ("river abundant in swan-potatoes"), on account of the large quantity of arrowheads or wild artichokes, known as "swan-potatoes" (waabizipiniin, singular waabizipin), once found near its banks. Severe flooding on the river in 1993, as part of the larger floods in region, caused widespread damage to the surrounding cropland.

Cities

The Wapsipinicon River runs alongside the Iowa cities and communities of McIntire, Riceville, Deerfield, Frederika, Tripoli, Littleton, Otterville, Independence, Quasqueton, Troy Mills, Paris, Central City, Waubeek, Stone City, Anamosa, Olin, Oxford Junction, Oxford Mills, Massillon, Toronto, Wheatland, McCausland, Folletts, and Shaffton before emptying into the Mississippi River. Cedar Rock State Park is located on the Wapsipinicon near Quasqueton. Wapsipinicon State Park is located along its southern bank at Anamosa. Many regional parks also border the river.

Fishing
The Wapsipinicon is known for excellent fishing for catfish, although it also contains abundant northern pike, carp, sunfish, and walleye (in some areas).

See also
List of Iowa rivers
List of rivers of Minnesota
List of longest streams of Minnesota
Wapsipinicon Almanac

References

External links
University of Iowa: Wapsipinicon River 

Rivers of Iowa
Rivers of Minnesota
Tributaries of the Mississippi River
Rivers of Scott County, Iowa
Rivers of Clinton County, Iowa
Rivers of Cedar County, Iowa
Rivers of Jones County, Iowa
Rivers of Linn County, Iowa
Rivers of Buchanan County, Iowa
Rivers of Black Hawk County, Iowa
Rivers of Bremer County, Iowa
Rivers of Chickasaw County, Iowa
Rivers of Howard County, Iowa
Rivers of Mitchell County, Iowa
Rivers of Mower County, Minnesota